Cicatrisestola is a genus of longhorn beetles of the subfamily Lamiinae, containing the following species:

 Cicatrisestola elongata Breuning, 1964
 Cicatrisestola flavicans Breuning, 1947
 Cicatrisestola humeralis Martins & Galileo, 1995

References

Desmiphorini